NGC 3271 is a barred lenticular galaxy in the constellation Antlia. It was discovered on May 1, 1834 by the astronomer John Herschel.

References

Antlia
Barred lenticular galaxies
3271
18340501
Antlia Cluster
IC objects
030988